Stephen Cain is the name of

 Stephen Cain (poet) (born 1970), Canadian poet
 Stephen Cain (athlete) (born 1984), Australian decathlete